Christopher Tignor (born March 15, 1976) is an American composer, musician, and software engineer based in New York City. A founding member of post-rock acts Slow Six and Wires Under Tension, Tignor is primarily known for his solo work as an electro-acoustic violinist "making computers coexist in harmony with acoustic instruments in a live setting". Tignor has composed and recorded string arrangements for This Will Destroy You, John Congleton, Keith Kenniff, Lymbyc Systym, and more.

Early life and career 
Tignor was born in Morristown, New Jersey. In 1998 he received a Bachelor of Arts in creative writing from Bard College, where he studied with composer Richard Teitelbaum and poet John Ashbery; he continued to collaborate with both after graduating. In 2003 he received a Master of Science degree in computer science from New York University, and in 2018 he received a PhD in music composition from Princeton. While living and studying in New York City, Tignor worked as a bike messenger and assistant to LaMonte Young and Mariana Zazeela, in addition to running sound and stage-managing for CBGB's.

From 1999 to 2008, Tignor was sound engineer and then technical director for Music at the Anthology (founded by Philip Glass, Eleonor Sandresky, and Lisa Bielawa), and in 2007, Tignor and The Knights performed the world premiere of Tignor's MATA Commission at the festival. In 2007, BYU's Barlow Endowment for Music Composition commissioned Tignor to write a new work for Brooklyn Rider String Quartet; the piece later appeared on the quartet's favorably-reviewed Seven Steps and was performed at Carnegie's Zankel Hall.

Tignor formed post-rock band Slow Six in 2000, expanding the group to nine members by 2007's Nor'easter.

He has given lectures and performances at the SOU Festival in Tbilisi, Georgia, the International Computer Music Conference in Daegu, Korea, the Victor Hugo theater in Havana, Cuba, and numerous other venues. He has also collaborated with contemporary dance troupes, video artists, and poets.

Tignor has worked at Google as a software engineer since 2011, and creates most of the (open-source) software he uses for live performance. He is also a sponsored artist of audio software maker Antares for his application of Auto-Tune as a "chorale" violin harmonizer, and of German tuning fork maker Wittner for his use of the device in performances. In 2022, Tignor released a collaborative album with This Will Destroy You co-founder Christopher Royal King under the name Disassembler.

Discography

Solo / As Leader

Composer / Performer

References 

1976 births
Living people
21st-century American composers
21st-century American male musicians
21st-century American violinists
American classical composers
American experimental musicians
American music arrangers
Bard College alumni
Experimental composers
New York University alumni
Western Vinyl artists
20th-century American male musicians